The 1908 South Carolina gubernatorial election was held on November 3, 1908, to select the governor of the state of South Carolina. Governor Martin Frederick Ansel faced state senator Coleman Livingston Blease in the Democratic primary and emerged victorious to win a second two-year term as governor.

Democratic primary
Coleman Livingston Blease entered the state Democratic primary for governor as the only opposition to incumbent Governor Martin Frederick Ansel. The voters saw no reason to not give Ansel another term for governor and Blease was defeated rather decisively on August 25.

General election
The general election was held on November 3, 1908, and Martin Frederick Ansel was reelected governor of South Carolina without opposition. Turnout increased over the previous gubernatorial election because there was also a presidential election on the ballot.

 

|-
| 
| colspan=5 |Democratic hold
|-

See also
Governor of South Carolina
List of governors of South Carolina
South Carolina gubernatorial elections

References

"Report of the Secretary of State to the General Assembly of South Carolina.  Part II." Reports and Resolutions of the General Assembly of the State of South Carolina. Volume III. Columbia, SC: 1909, pp. 154–155.

External links
SCIway Biography of Martin Frederick Ansel

Gubernatorial
1908
South Carolina
November 1908 events